The Permanent Committee on Geographical Names (PCGN) is an independent inter-departmental body in the United Kingdom established in 1919. Its function is to establish standard names for places outside the UK,   for the use of the  British government. The Committtee has collaborated with the  Foreign Names Committee of the United States Board on Geographic Names to agree a joint romanization system, first published in 1994 as the Romanization Systems and Roman-Script Spelling Conventions.
 
The members of the PCGN are: British Broadcasting Corporation Monitoring Service, Intelligence Collection Group (ICG) (formerly Defence Geospatial Intelligence), Defence Intelligence Staff, Foreign and Commonwealth Office, Government Communications Headquarters, Hydrographic Office, Ordnance Survey, Royal Geographical Society and Royal Scottish Geographical Society.

A third of the costs of the PCGN are met by the Foreign and Commonwealth Office (FCO) and two thirds by the Ministry of Defence. In answer to a parliamentary question in 2007, the cost of the PCGN to the FCO was disclosed as being £59,826.83 for the 2005/2006 financial year. This results in a total cost in that financial year of £179,480.49.

References

External links
PCGN Home Page
History of PCGN, published by UK Government

Public bodies and task forces of the United Kingdom government
Place names
Geographical naming agencies